Joice Cristina de Souza Rodrigues (born September 6, 1986) is a Brazilian female basketball player. At the 2012 Summer Olympics, she competed for the Brazil women's national basketball team in the women's event.

References

Brazilian women's basketball players
1986 births
Living people
Olympic basketball players of Brazil
Point guards
Basketball players at the 2012 Summer Olympics
Basketball players at the 2016 Summer Olympics
People from Bauru
Sportspeople from São Paulo (state)